Deion Deryl Barnes (born January 20, 1993) is a former American football outside linebacker currently serving as the defensive line coach at his alma mater, Penn State. He played high school football at Northeast High School in Philadelphia, Pennsylvania before playing college football at Penn State from 2011 until 2014, earning the Big Ten Freshman of the Year award in 2012. Barnes signed with the New York Jets as an undrafted free agent in 2015, signed with the Kansas City Chiefs in the 2016 offseason, and was part of the San Antonio Commanders during the short-lived Alliance of American Football in 2019. In 2020, he returned to his alma mater at Penn State as a graduate assistant and assistant defensive line coach.

Professional career

New York Jets
Barnes was signed as an undrafted free agent by the New York Jets on May 8, 2015. On August 28, 2016, Barnes was waived by the Jets.

Kansas City Chiefs
On October 19, the Kansas City Chiefs signed Barnes to their practice squad. He was released by the Chiefs on October 26, 2016.

San Antonio Commanders
In 2018, Barnes joined the San Antonio Commanders of the Alliance of American Football. The league ceased operations in April 2019.

References

External links
Penn State bio

1993 births
Living people
American football linebackers
American football defensive ends
Penn State Nittany Lions football players
New York Jets players
Kansas City Chiefs players
Players of American football from Philadelphia
San Antonio Commanders players